Frederick Kenneth "Scooter" Doty (October 25, 1924 – November 9, 2014) was a Canadian football player who played for the Toronto Argonauts. He won the Grey Cup with them in 1945, 1946 and 1947. He is a member of the Mississauga Sports Hall of Fame. Doty died of bladder cancer on November 9, 2014, aged 90.

References

1924 births
2014 deaths
Canadian football people from Toronto
Toronto Argonauts players
Canadian football quarterbacks
Players of Canadian football from Ontario
Deaths from bladder cancer
Deaths from cancer in Ontario